Buckman Tavern is a historic American Revolutionary War site associated with the revolution's very first battle, the 1775 Battle of Lexington and Concord. It is located on the Battle Green in Lexington, Massachusetts and operated as a museum by the Lexington Historical Society.

History
The tavern was built in about 1709–1710 by Benjamin Muzzey (1657–1735), and with license granted in 1693 was the first public house in Lexington. Muzzey ran it for years, then his son John, and then at the time of the battle it was run by John's granddaughter and her husband John Buckman, a member of the Lexington Training Band. In those years the tavern was a favorite gathering place for militiamen on days when they trained on the Lexington Green. (Lexington, unlike other local communities, did not establish a minuteman company, instead maintaining a "training band" [an old English phrase for a militia company] for local defense).

Battles of Lexington and Concord
The Battle of Lexington and Concord took form before dawn on April 19, 1775. Having received word that the regular army had left Boston in force to seize and destroy military supplies in Concord, several dozen militiamen gathered on the town common, and then eventually went to the tavern to await the arrival of the British troops. Definite word reached them just before sunrise, and Captain Parker's company of militia left the tavern to assemble in two ranks on the common. Following the arrival of the army, a single shot was fired; by whom, it is still unknown. With this shot, the American Revolutionary War began.

Although best known as the headquarters of the militia, Buckman Tavern is also noteworthy as perhaps the busiest of Lexington's 18th-century taverns. It housed the first village store in Lexington, and later, in 1813, the first town post office.

Historic site
The tavern's interior appears today very much as it did in 1775 and one can see the restored 18th-century taproom with large fireplace and central chimney. Among the many items on display is the old front door, with its bullet hole possibly made by a British musket ball during the battle, and a portrait of John Buckman.

It was declared a National Historic Landmark in 1961.

See also
 Munroe Tavern (Lexington, Massachusetts)
 List of National Historic Landmarks in Massachusetts
 National Register of Historic Places listings in Middlesex County, Massachusetts

References

External links

 Buckman Tavern – Lexington Historical Society

Buildings and structures completed in 1690
Commercial buildings completed in the 17th century
Houses in Lexington, Massachusetts
National Historic Landmarks in Massachusetts
Massachusetts in the American Revolution
History museums in Massachusetts
Museums in Middlesex County, Massachusetts
Drinking establishments on the National Register of Historic Places in Massachusetts
National Register of Historic Places in Middlesex County, Massachusetts
Taverns in the American Revolution
American Revolution on the National Register of Historic Places
1690 establishments in Massachusetts